4: John Paul George Ringo is a digital extended play compilation released on 23 September 2014, as a free download by the iTunes Store. It features one solo song by each former member of the Beatles: John Lennon, Paul McCartney, George Harrison and Ringo Starr. It is the first official release to bring together their solo material (though two Starr solo albums, Ringo and Ringo's Rotogravure, and the 1996 Carl Perkins album Go Cat Go! featured contributions from each of the four).

The EP was released to promote the iTunes remastering of several solo albums by each former Beatle. It is no longer available for purchase.

Background
As early as 1971, the year after the Beatles broke up, Lennon suggested that disappointed fans could compile the former members’ solo material themselves to create new "Beatles" records:

"If people need the Beatles so much, all they have to do is to buy each album and … put it on tape, track by track, one of me, one of Paul, one of George, one of Ringo, if they really need it that much. Because otherwise the music is the same, only on separate albums."

The compilers of the 1972 bootleg Alpha Omega came close to achieving that, by adding Lennon's "Imagine", Harrison's "Bangla Desh" and McCartney's "Maybe I'm Amazed", along with other songs by the three former bandmates, to the Beatles hits that made up the bulk of the compilation. Alpha Omega appears to be the first commercial release of any sort to include solo material from different ex-Beatles.

But when Apple responded to Alpha Omega with the 1973 compilations 1962–1966 and 1967–1970, it did not follow the bootleggers' example. Although there was no contractual barrier to including solo material – the former Beatles remained committed to EMI as individuals until January 1976 – those compilations and every subsequent authorised Beatles collection were limited to Beatles material. Over time, EMI released separate solo compilations for each of the four former Beatles. Some of these included the artist's Beatles songs, but none included solo material by other former Beatles.

In September 2014, iTunes released newly remastered several of the former Beatles' key solo albums. 4: John Paul George Ringo was released as a free download sampler to promote the remastering. The EP was credited to "various artists"; the name "Beatles" did not appear in the digital packaging.

The tracks span 39 years, from Harrison's "Let It Down", from his 1970 album All Things Must Pass, to Starr's "Walk with You", released as a single in 2009. Lennon's "Love" is from the 1970 album John Lennon/Plastic Ono Band; McCartney's "Call Me Back Again" is from the 1975 Wings album Venus and Mars.

The cover of 4: John Paul George Ringo echoes that of 1, the Beatles' 2000 compilation. Where 1 features a red cover with a large painted numeral 1 and the credit "The Beatles", 4: John Paul George Ringo features a blue cover with a large painted numeral 4 and the former bandmates' first names. The cover also includes solo-era portraits of each of the four.

While all of the tracks were well known to fans, only Starr's "Walk with You" had been released as a single, and none were among the artists' best-known hits.

Starr's "Walk with You" features McCartney on bass and additional vocals.

Track listing

Personnel
"Love"
John Lennon – vocals, acoustic guitar
Phil Spector – piano

"Call Me Back Again"
Paul McCartney – vocals, bass, guitars, keyboards, piano
Linda McCartney – keyboards, backing vocals
Denny Laine – guitars, keyboards
Jimmy McCulloch – guitars
Joe English – drums

"Let It Down"
George Harrison – vocals, electric guitar, slide guitar, backing vocals
Eric Clapton – electric guitar, backing vocals
Gary Wright – organ
Gary Brooker – piano
Carl Radle – bass
Jim Gordon – drums
Bobby Keys – saxophones
Jim Price – trumpet, trombone, horn arrangement
John Barham – string arrangement
Pete Ham – acoustic guitar
Tom Evans – acoustic guitar
Joey Molland – acoustic guitar
uncredited – shaker
Bobby Whitlock – backing vocals

"Walk with You"
Ringo Starr – drums, vocals, background vocals, percussion
Paul McCartney – additional vocals, bass
Steve Dudas – guitar
Ann Marie Calhoun – violin
Bruce Sugar – keyboards, string arrangement

References

2014 compilation albums
2014 EPs
Albums free for download by copyright owner
Albums produced by George Harrison
Albums produced by John Lennon
Albums produced by Paul McCartney
Albums produced by Phil Spector
Albums produced by Ringo Starr
Albums produced by Yoko Ono
ITunes-exclusive releases
Pop rock compilation albums
Rock EPs
Split EPs
Universal Music Group compilation albums
Universal Music Group EPs